Thornbill can refer to:

Acanthiza, a genus of Australian passerine birds.
 Two genera of hummingbirds, Chalcostigma and Ramphomicron

Animal common name disambiguation pages